Rosa Sels (born 26 September 1943) is a former Belgian racing cyclist. She won the Belgian national road race title in 1960.

References

External links
 

1943 births
Living people
Belgian female cyclists
Cyclists from Antwerp Province
People from Vorselaar